Latifa al-Zayyat (8 August 1923 – 10 September 1996) was an Egyptian activist and writer, most famous for her novel The Open Door, which won the inaugural Naguib Mahfouz Medal for Literature.

Biography
Al Zayyat was born in Dumyat, Egypt, on 8 August 1923. She earned her bachelor's degree in English in 1946 from Cairo University and earned her PhD at the same university in 1957.

She was a professor of English at the Girls College of Ain Shams University and the chair of the department of English at the same university. She also served as the director of the Egyptian Arts Academy.

Two of al-Zayyat's novels are translated to English, The Owner of the House and The Open Door. The latter, published in 1960, was strikingly modern for its time, both for its use of colloquial Egyptian Arabic and for its depiction of the main character's political and sexual awakening. The novel begins in 1946 and ends in 1956, with the Suez Crisis. It was also turned into a popular film. Al-Zayyat also wrote many essays on women and critiques as well as reviews of novels and political happenings.

She died of cancer at age 73 in Cairo on 10 September 1996.

Tribute
On 8 August 2015, Google dedicated a Doodle to the writer for the 92nd anniversary of her birth. The Doodle reached all the countries of the Arab World.

References

1923 births
1996 deaths
Cairo University alumni
Egyptian women academics
Academic staff of Ain Shams University
Egyptian activists
Egyptian women activists
Recipients of the Naguib Mahfouz Medal for Literature
Egyptian feminists
Egyptian writers